State Highway 234 (SH 234) is a short state highway connecting Edroy and Odem in San Patricio County, Texas.

Route description
SH 234 begins in Edroy, at I-37 southbound's exit 22; the roadway north of this interchange is designated FM 796. The route travels south into central Edroy before turning to the east, where it intersects the frontage road of northbound I-37's exit 22. The highway continues to the east before turning to the southeast, becoming Main Street in Odem. The SH 234 designation ends at US 77; the roadway beyond this intersection is designated FM 631.

History
The route was designated on August 1, 1936 along its current route.

Major intersections

References

234
Transportation in San Patricio County, Texas